Katy Falls in the Caney Creek Wilderness is a 12-foot waterfall in the Ouachita National Forest.

Katy Falls is on a spur near where the Buckeye Trail joins the Caney Creek Trail. Also nearby is the mouth of Katy Creek, where it flows into Caney Creek.

References

Waterfalls of Arkansas
Ouachita Mountains
Ouachita National Forest